Manarat International University (MIU) is a private university in Dhaka, Bangladesh. It was established in 2001 by the Manarat Trust.

History 
Manarat International University was established on 21 May 2001 by the Manarat Trust which owns Manarat Dhaka International School and College.

In August 2016, Rapid Action Battalion arrested three students of the university who were members of the female unit of Jama'atul Mujahideen Bangladesh. Counter Terrorism and Transnational Crime arrested a student of the university for being a member and recruiter of a banned religious extremist group, Ansar Al Islam, in November 2021.

In September 2022, the Government of Bangladesh dismantled the existing trustee board alleging it had links with Islamist militants and Bangladesh Jamaat-e-Islami. The vice-chancellor, Md Nazrul Islam, said he was ignorant about the allegations as he was appointed only in 2020. Mayor of North Dhaka and Awami League politician, Atiqul Islam, was appointed chairman of the newly created Trustee board. Justices Zafar Ahmed and Md Akhtaruzzaman of the High Court Division issued a ruling in October asking the government to explain why their actions should not be declared illegal following a petition by Professor AKM Fazlul Haque, who was a member of the disbanded trustee board of Manarat International University. In November, the University offered a 50 per cent discount on admission fees.

On 2 January 2023, the University Grants Commission ordered Manarat International University to only recruit students for their permanent campus and not their temporary campuses.

Departments
Department of Computer Science and Engineering(CSE)
Department of Electronics and Electrical Engineering(EEE)
Department of Pharmacy    
Department of English
Department of Journalism and Media Studies
Department of Business Administration(BBA)
Department of Law(LLB)
Department of (Islamic Studies)

The university offers the following postgraduate programs:
Masters of Arts in English
Masters of Business Administration(MBA)
M.Pharm(Will begin soon)

List of vice-chancellors 
 Md Nazrul Islam (present)

Board of trustees

Library
Manarat International University library — MIU Library — has more than 16,000 books, 200 e-books, 150 DVDs and a collection of print journals and other publications. The library subscribes to 10 local journals, 5 foreign and 5 local magazines, one foreign daily and most of the leading national dailies published from Dhaka. The library can accommodate over 200 students in its reading rooms. On average 800 students use the library each day. The library has two branches: one at Gulshan Campus and another at Mirpur Campus.

Research scope
Manarat University inspires and provides ample opportunity for research. The pharmacy department's laboratories are well equipped by modern research items. It has launched the following labs for pharmacy department:
 Pharmaceutical Microbiology Lab
 Pharmaceutical Analysis lab
 Pharmaceutical Technology lab
 Pharmacognosy Lab
 Medicinal chemistry Lab
 Animal Lab for Physiological Research
 Chemistry Lab (for synthetic chemistry)

See also
 Manarat Dhaka International School and College

References

External links

Universities and colleges in Bangladesh